Leon Black (February 21, 1932 – October 12, 2021) was an American college basketball coach.

Black, who coached the Texas Longhorns men's basketball team from 1967 to 1976, guided the Longhorns to two NCAA Tournaments as a result of winning the Southwest Conference twice in his nine seasons as head coach. The Longhorns lost in the Sweet Sixteen in 1972 and the first round in 1974. Prior to his time at Texas, Black was head coach at junior college Lon Morris College, compiling a 131–35 record in five seasons.

Black resigned in 1976 and was replaced by Abe Lemons.

Black died on October 12, 2021.

Head coaching record

References

1932 births
2021 deaths
American men's basketball coaches
American men's basketball players
Basketball coaches from Texas
Basketball players from Texas
College men's basketball head coaches in the United States
Junior college men's basketball coaches in the United States
People from Van Zandt County, Texas
Texas Longhorns men's basketball coaches
Texas Longhorns men's basketball players